Baghdad Medical City formerly known as Saddam Medical City (1983-2003) and before that known as Medical City Teaching Hospital (1973-1983) is a complex of several teaching hospitals in Bab Al-Moatham, Baghdad, Iraq. The complex stands where the former Garden of Ridvan of Baghdad was.

The Medical City includes the Baghdad University College of Medicine. The largest hospital in the complex is the Surgical Specialties Hospital built in 1980. The second largest is the Baghdad Teaching Hospital, opened in 1970, which contains the out patient clinics and the emergency department. The complex has over a thousand beds for patients.

Facilities & Buildings:
Baghdad Teaching Hospital
Surgical Specialties  Hospital (the same building includes Iraqi Center for Cardiac Diseases, Toxicology Center and Kidney Transplant Center)
Private Nursing Home Hospital
Child Protection Teaching Hospital (the same building includes Bone Marrow Transplant Center)
Medical City Department (General Management Department)
Central Laboratories
institute of radiology 
Pasteur Institute
Physiotherapy Departments in all hospitals & centres links directly to the rehabilitation department in MoH
Tuberculosis Health Center (TB and Chest Institute)
National Center for Blood Transfusion
Gastroenterology & Hepatology centre.
Specialized Burn Hospital.
 Medical and Health libraries with internet centres.
 Medicolegal Center, Forensics pathology department.
 Medical and healthcare Schools
Doctors, health and medical specialities residency housing
Police Department.

Financial crisis
In 2008 there was only one working elevator, out of ten, in the 18 storey building and no air-conditioning.

In February 2016, the hospital, like all public hospitals in Iraq, began to charge patients for individual services. It was expected that supplies of advanced medical equipment like pacemakers and stents will run out during 2016.

See also
 List of hospitals in Iraq
 Ministry of Health (Iraq)
The Iraqi Center for Heart Diseases

References

 In Baghdad, Even the Hospitals Are Sick
 ncciraq

Government of Iraq
Buildings and structures in Baghdad
1973 establishments in Iraq
Hospitals in Iraq
Medical education in Iraq
Teaching hospitals